The 2015 Clarkson Cup was a women's ice hockey tournament that was contested in Markham, Ontario to determine the champion of the Canadian Women's Hockey League from March 4 to March 7, 2014. The Boston Blades defeated the Montreal Stars by a 3-2 tally in overtime to claim their second title. The tournament was played at Markham Centennial Centre. The overtime-winning goal was scored by Janine Weber, who became the first European player to score a Cup-winning goal. Weber's stick that she used to score the Cup-winning goal was donated to the Hockey Hall of Fame.

First round

Championship game

Scoring leaders

Boston Blades – 2015 Clarkson Cup champions

Defenders
2 Kelly Cooke   
4 Alyssa Gagliardi 
5 Blake Bolden  
8 Kaleigh Fratkin 
11 Tara Watchorn 
15 Monique Lamoureux 
22 Kacey Bellamy 
56 Jessica Koizumi 

Forwards
3 Jillian Dempsey 
6 Janine Weber 
7 Casey Pickett 
10 Megan Myers 
12 Rachel Llanes 
13 Brianna Decker 
16 Ashley Cottrell 
17 Meghan Duggan 
18 Jordan Smelker 
23 Corinne Buie 
24 Denna Laing 
26 Bray Ketchum 
27 Hilary Knight (Captain) 

Goaltenders
30 Brittany Ott   
33 Genevieve Lacasse  

Coaching and Administrative Staff''
Aronda Brown (General Manager)
Digit Murphy  (Head coach)

Awards and honours
Most Valuable Player, Charline Labonte, Montreal Stars
First Star of the Game, Hilary Knight, Boston Blades
Second Star of the Game, Brianna Decker, Boston Blades
Third Star of the Game, Charline Labonte, Montreal Stars

References

Clarkson Cup
2015